The 1997 Oregon State Beavers football team represented Oregon State University in the 1997 NCAA Division I-A football season. They were led by head coach Mike Riley. The Beavers participated as members of the Pacific-10 Conference and played their home games at Parker Stadium in Corvallis, Oregon.

Schedule

References

Oregon State
Oregon State Beavers football seasons
Oregon State Beavers football